Olegario Vázquez Raña (born 10 December 1935) is a Mexican entrepreneur, businessman, owner of several companies, and the chairman and principal shareholder of Grupo Empresarial Ángeles. He is married to María de los Angeles Aldir and he is the father of Olegario Vázquez Aldir, one of the richest businessman in Mexico.

Sports career
Vázquez Raña was a member of Mexico's shooting team at all Olympic Games from 1964 to 1976  and all world championships from 1966 to 1979. He is the national record-holder in many shooting disciplines and the world record-holder in air rifle (1973 and 1975).

Sports administration
President of the Mexican Shooting Federation (1975 - 1992).
Lifelong Honorary President (1992 - ).
Vice-President of the Mexican Sports Confederation (1983 - 1992).
Permanent member of the National Olympic Committee (NOC) (1969 - ).
President of the International Shooting Sport Federation (ISSF) (1980 - 2018).
President of the Shooting Confederation of the Americas (1979 - ).
Member of Association of Summer Olympic International Federations (ASOIF) Council (1987 - ).

References

External links
Official Website of the Olympic Movement 
"Grupo Empresarial Angeles" Website 

1935 births
Living people
Mexican businesspeople
International Olympic Committee members
Shooters at the 1964 Summer Olympics
Shooters at the 1968 Summer Olympics
Shooters at the 1972 Summer Olympics
Shooters at the 1976 Summer Olympics
Mexican male sport shooters
Olympic shooters of Mexico
Pan American Games medalists in shooting
Pan American Games gold medalists for Mexico
Pan American Games silver medalists for Mexico
Pan American Games bronze medalists for Mexico
Shooters at the 1963 Pan American Games
Shooters at the 1967 Pan American Games